Taobei District is the main urban district of the prefecture-level city of Baicheng in China's northeastern Jilin province.  It was formerly the county-level city of Baicheng until 1993, when the former Baicheng Prefecture became Baicheng prefecture-level city, while the prefectural capital Baicheng county-level city was renamed Taobei District.

Administrative Divisions
There are nine subdistricts, five towns, and 10 townships.

Subdistricts:
Haiming Subdistrict, Changqing Subdistrict, Ruiguang Subdistrict, Mingren Subdistrict, Tiedong Subdistrict, Xinli Subdistrict, Xingfu Subdistrict, Xinhua Subdistrict, Pingtai Subdistrict

Towns:
Lingxia, Ping'an, Qingshan, Linhai, Taohe

Townships:
Houjia Township, Baoping Township, Daling Township, Dongfeng Township, Sanhe Township, Lingxia Township, Taodong Township, Jinxiang Township, Yongsheng Township, Deshun Township

References

External links

County-level divisions of Jilin